Kai Larsen (15 November 1926 in Hillerød – 23 August 2012) was a Danish botanist.

Kai Larsen was professor of botany (Emeritus from 1-12-1996) at Århus University, Denmark. He was the Danish editor of Flora Nordica, editor of Flora of Thailand, advisor to Flora of China and executive member of Flora Malesiana.

He was a member of the Norwegian Academy of Science and Letters. and the Royal Danish Academy of Sciences and Letters.

Research 
SE Asian flora region, particularly Thailand, Malaysia and Indo-China. Revisions of several families e. g. Caesalpiniaceae, Caryophyllaceae, and Lowiaceae for several of the regional floras.
Zingiberaceae for Flora of Thailand and Flora Malesiana.

Eponymous species 
Some plant names are taxonomic patronyms recognizing his contribution to studying Asian flora.

Genera 
 Kailarsenia: a fragrant plant from the family Rubiaceae that can be found in Southeast Asia.
 Larsenaikia: once endemic Australian species of Gardenia in the family Rubiaceae. This name is a taxonomic anagram derived from genus Kailarsenia.

 The generic name Kaisupeea  (Gesneriaceae) honours Kai and Supee Larsen.

Species 
 Burmannia larseniana D.X.Zhang & R.M.K.Saunders (Burmanniaceae)
 Bauhinia larsenii Y.F. Chen & D.X. Zhang, fossil Leguminosae from southern China
 Caulokaempferia larsenii Suksathan & Triboun
 Cornukaempferia larsenii Saensouk, Theerakulpisut, & Chantaranothai
 Curcuma larsenii C. Maknoi & T. Jenjittikul
 Impatiens larsenii T. Shimizu
 Kaempferia larsenii Sirirugsa
 Mouretia larsenii Tange
 Zingiber larsenii Theilade

References 

1926 births
20th-century Danish botanists
2012 deaths
Botanists active in South Asia
Members of the Norwegian Academy of Science and Letters
People from Hillerød Municipality
Academic staff of Aarhus University